Rika Kihira (born 21 July 2002) is a Japanese figure skater. She is a two-time Four Continents champion (2019, 2020), the 2018 Grand Prix Final champion, a four-time Grand Prix series medalist (2018 NHK Trophy gold, 2018 Internationaux de France gold, 2019 Skate Canada silver, 2019 NHK Trophy silver), a two-time International Challenge Cup champion, and a two-time Japanese national champion (2019, 2020). As of 25 March 2022, Kihira is the twelfth highest ranked women's singles skater in the world by the International Skating Union. 

On the junior level, she is the 2016 JGP Slovenia champion, the 2016 JGP Czech Republic silver medalist, the 2017 JGP Latvia silver medalist, and the 2017 Japanese junior national champion.

Kihira is the seventh woman to have landed the triple Axel jump in an International Skating Union competition, the first ever woman to land a triple Axel-triple toe loop combination, the first woman to land eight clean triples in a free skate, the second woman to land four clean triples in the short program, and the third woman to land twelve clean triples in one competition (all the maximum allowed under the Zayak rule).

Personal life 
Kihira was born on 21 July 2002 in Nishinomiya, Japan. In December 2020, she announced that she had been accepted to Waseda University's School of Human Sciences and would start attending via correspondence course from spring 2021.

Career 
Kihira began learning to skate in 2007. In the 2015–16 season, she competed on the advanced novice level, winning gold at the Triglav Trophy. She was invited to skate in the gala at the 2015 NHK Trophy as the Japanese national novice champion in the same season.

She is coached by Mie Hamada and Yamato Tamura in Takatsuki, Osaka.

According to Hamada, Kihira didn't have any triple jumps when she first came to her, but she still noticed Kihira's high potential in her upper body strength (from gymnastics) and speed while running. Hamada recalled that she was convinced from the first day she saw Kihira skate that she could "master a triple Axel." The first thing Hamada did was teach Kihira how to control her axis while jumping in order to prepare her for triple jumps.

2016–17 season: International junior debut 

Kihira made her Junior Grand Prix (JGP) debut in the 2016–17 season. In early September, she won the silver medal in Ostrava, Czech Republic, with a total score 0.08 less than Anastasiia Gubanova of Russia. Later that month, she outscored World junior champion Marin Honda by 15.49 points for the gold in Ljubljana, Slovenia. Kihira landed a triple Axel jump in the free skate, becoming the seventh ladies skater in history to do so. She also became the first female skater ever to land eight clean triples in the free skate (the maximum allowed under the Zayak rule). She qualified to the 2016–17 JGP Final in Marseille, France, where she finished fourth.

2017–18 season: Second JGPF 
Kihira began her season by winning a gold medal at the Asian Trophy in Hong Kong. She was able to land a triple Axel in her free skate.

Kihira was assigned JGP events in Latvia and Italy. In her first event at JGP Riga, Kihira placed sixth in the short program after stepping out of her triple flip and falling on her triple Lutz. After winning the free skate, she finished second overall behind Daria Panenkova.

In her next event at JGP Egna, she won the bronze medal behind Sofia Samodurova and Alena Kostornaia after placing second in the short program and third in the free skate. The results qualified her for her second JGP Final in Nagoya, Japan over Mako Yamashita through a tiebreaker.

At the 2017 JGP Final, she became the first-ever woman to land a triple Axel-triple jump combination in an international competition organized by the International Skating Union. She was the only non-Russian competitor and finished fourth overall, following a popped Axel and an under-rotation on another jump.

Kihira won the gold medal at Junior Nationals. She placed sixth in the short program but rebounded in the free skate with a triple Axel and triple Axel-triple toe loop-double toe loop.

On the senior level, Kihira won the bronze medal at Japanese Nationals after placing fifth in the short program and second in the free skate. As she was age-ineligible to compete as a senior, she was sent to the 2018 World Junior Championships, where she placed eighth.

2018–19 season: Grand Prix Final & Four Continents gold 
Making her senior debut, Kihira began the season with a gold medal at the 2018 Ondrej Nepela Trophy, an ISU Challenger Series event. Kihira placed first in the short program, despite falling on her triple Axel. She also placed first in the long program with eight fully rotated triple jumps, including a triple Axel-triple toe loop and a solo triple Axel, and set a free skate world record of 147.37 points.

For her senior Grand Prix debut, Kihira was originally assigned only one event. At 2018 NHK Trophy, Kihira was fifth in the short program after underrotating and falling on her triple Axel again. She placed first in the free skate with a solo triple Axel, a triple Axel-triple toe loop, and eight triple jumps in total, winning the gold medal overall. In doing so, she finished ahead of compatriot and reigning Japanese national champion Satoko Miyahara and 2015 World Champion Elizaveta Tuktamysheva, who also performed a triple Axel in her free program. She admitted afterward: "When I finished my short program, I didn’t think I would be up here today. The short program motivated me to be good today."

Due to her results at the 2018 NHK Trophy, Kihira was assigned another Grand Prix event. At the Internationaux de France, Kihira singled the triple Axel in the short program, placing third. In the free skate, she underrotated her sole triple Axel attempt but still placed first and captured her second Grand Prix gold medal. Kihira stated that she was glad to have won but was unsatisfied with her performance.

The 2018–19 Grand Prix Final was regarded by many commentators as a contest between Kihira and reigning Olympic champion Alina Zagitova, who had been forced to withdraw from the Ondrej Nepela Trophy earlier due to visa issues. Kihira won the short program with a world record score of 82.51, landing the triple Axel in the short program for the first time that season. She then placed first in the free skate with a score of 150.61 and won the gold medal, despite downgrading and falling on her opening triple Axel.

Kihira entered the 2018 Japanese Championships as a favourite to take the national title, but she struggled with boot problems in the competition and made multiple errors in the short program that, left her in fifth place going into the free skate. She placed first in the free skate, her only mistake being a downgraded Euler in her three-jump combination. However, she won the silver medal overall in front of training mate and four-time national champion Satoko Miyahara. The gold medal went to Kaori Sakamoto.

At the 2019 Four Continents Championships, Kihira initially "hesitated" at including the triple Axel in the short program but chose to do so and singled it. She placed fifth in the short. In the free program, Kihira landed one triple Axel and substituted a double Axel-triple toe loop combination for the second, winning both the free program and the overall championship decisively. She observed: "During this season, I learned how to keep my concentration in my free skating no matter what happens in my short program."

Kihira was one of three Japanese ladies assigned to the 2019 World Championships, held in Saitama, and based on her record that season was widely considered the favourite to win the title. In the short program, she once again singled her triple Axel attempt, leaving her in seventh place and outside of the final group of six skaters.  She came second in the free skate, earning a silver small medal, landing a clean triple Axel-triple toe loop and falling on her second triple Axel. In fourth overall, she was 0.31 points behind bronze medalist Evgenia Medvedeva and 1.27 points behind silver medalist Elizabet Tursynbaeva. It was the only podium Kihira missed in the season and the only international competition she did not win.

Kihira concluded the season representing Team Japan at the 2019 World Team Trophy. She landed the triple Axel in the short program for only the second time that season, setting another world record of 83.97. However, Kihira fell twice in the free, once on her opening triple Axel and the other on her triple Lutz-triple toe loop combination, placing fifth. Team Japan won the silver medal overall.

2019–20 season: First national title, second Four Continents gold 
Kihira began her season at 2019 CS Autumn Classic International, where she ranked first in both the short program and in the free, finishing in first place overall, and landing all three of her planned triple Axels, albeit with one called underrotated. Kihira stated that she hoped to introduce a quad Salchow into competition later in the season but had declined to attempt it there as she felt her triple Axel was more stable. Although she landed one triple Lutz in her free skate at this event, a persistent ankle problem led her not to attempt any further triple Lutz jumps in competition during the first half of the season.

Her next competition was Skate Canada, where she placed first after a clean short program scoring 81.35. In the free skate, Kihira stepped out of her first triple Axel but had a clean skate after that. She earned 148.98 points in the free skate to score 230.33 overall and finish second overall behind Alexandra Trusova, who landed three quad jumps in her free skate.  Kihira stated afterward that Trusova's performance motivated her to work to increase her scoring potential in the future.  Competing at the 2019 NHK Trophy, Kihira landed her Axel and combination cleanly but had a poor landing on her triple loop, placing second behind Alena Kostornaia, who also performed a triple Axel and broke Kihira's short program world record.  Having also finished second in the free skate, she won a second silver medal and qualified for the Grand Prix Final.  Kihira stated afterward that her ankle continued to be a problem after three months, with the possibility that it might be a tendon issue that would require time away from competition to heal.

Competing at the Grand Prix Final, Kihira put her foot down on her triple Axel and fell on her jump combination, consequently placing sixth out of the six skaters in the segment, almost fifteen points behind Kostornaia in first place. Kihira expressed regret over her performance, attributing much of it to discomfort with skating in the evening rather than the morning.  In the free skate, Kihira attempted the quad Salchow in competition for the first time, fully rotating the jump but falling. She placed fourth in that segment and rose to fourth place overall. Speaking afterward, Kihira said, "as for the quads, a lot of girls are doing different quads now, and I know I also need to work harder. Of course, I want to first get my quad Salchow consistent, and then maybe I will try quad toe."

Entering the 2019–20 Japanese Championships as the favourite for the title, Kihira placed first in the short program despite stepping out of her triple Axel and losing levels on one of her spins.  She won the free skate commandingly, making only a single error when she under-rotated the triple toe loop in her opening jump combination, and took the Japanese national title for the first time ahead of Wakaba Higuchi and Tomoe Kawabata.  She indicated that she hoped to reintroduce the triple Lutz into competition for the 2020 World Championships.

In February, Kihira competed at the 2020 Four Continents Championships with countrywomen Higuchi and Kaori Sakamoto. In the short program, she placed first ahead of Bradie Tennell of the United States and training mate You Young of South Korea. She included the triple Lutz for the first time since the Autumn Classic.  In the free skate, she popped her first triple Axel attempt to a single, the first time she had done so during that season, but performed the rest of the program cleanly and improvised an additional triple-triple combination. She, therefore, still performed eight triple jumps and, for the first time in international competition, landed twelve clean triple jumps in one competition. She won the free skate and the overall competition with a new season's best-combined total (232.34) ahead of You and Tennell. She became the first singles skater, male or female, to win consecutive Four Continents titles. She then won the 2020 International Challenge Cup ahead of compatriot Yuhana Yokoi. She once again scored over 230 points in the combined total, making her one of only two ladies skaters to score over 200 points in every competition they entered in both the 2018–19 and 2019–20 seasons, along with Alexandra Trusova of Russia.

Kihira was scheduled to compete at the 2020 World Championships in Montreal, but the event was cancelled as a result of the coronavirus pandemic.  In June, Kihira announced that she would add Brian Orser, the coach of Olympic champions Kim Yuna and Yuzuru Hanyu, to her coaching team, and begin training at the Toronto Cricket, Skating & Curling Club as soon as travel restrictions allowed. She stated that the motivation behind this change was a desire to better her technique and master a greater range of quadruple jumps. However, the persistence of travel restrictions through July required her to abandon plans to have programs choreographed by Lori Nichol in Toronto.  She subsequently spent time at Stephane Lambiel's training camp in Switzerland.

2020–21 season: First quad, second national title 
Continuing to train in Champéry under Lambiel rather than go to Canada or return to Japan, Kihira was correspondingly assigned to compete at the 2020 Internationaux de France when the ISU assigned skaters to compete at one event apiece for the 2020–21 Grand Prix. In October, her ISU bio formally listed Lambiel as one of her coaches, with the other being Hamada.  The Internationaux was subsequently cancelled as a result of the pandemic.

Kihira returned to Japan to compete at the 2020–21 Japan Championships, where she was considered the heavy favourite to win. The possibility of her again attempting the quad Salchow in competition was much-discussed in advance of the event. Kihira said that the decision to attempt it in the free skate would depend on how the short program went.  She won the short program despite a minor error on the second part of her jump combination and a lost spin level, ending the segment with a lead of 7.48 points over second-place Kaori Sakamoto. Kihira opened her free program by successfully landing a quad Salchow.  She went on to underrotate her only triple Axel attempt in the free and did not attempt a triple Lutz, but won the segment and the gold medal overall ahead of former champions Sakamoto and Satoko Miyahara. Of the quad, she said afterward that "I'd wanted to do it before, but this time I pushed any nerves and any extraneous thoughts out of my mind and just focused on an image of me nailing it."

Kihira was chosen to represent Japan at the 2021 World Championships, where she was rated as a contender for the title alongside the top Russian skaters. She placed second in the short program after her triple Axel and toe loop were a quarter of a rotation short. In the free skate, Kihira doubled her first attempt at a triple Axel, fell on an underrotated second attempt, and underrotated two other jumps, finishing ninth in that segment and dropping to seventh place overall. Her placement, combined with that of Sakamoto, who finished above her in sixth, qualified three ladies' berths for Japan to the 2022 Winter Olympics.

Subsequently, Kihira was announced as part of the Japanese team for the 2021 World Team Trophy. She did not plan to attempt the quad Salchow jump due to suffering from a lower-back strain and also returned to her previous free skate music for the competition. Kihira placed fourth in the short program and fifth in the free skate at the Trophy, while Team Japan won the bronze medal.

2021–22 season: Coaching change, hiatus 
Kihira injured her right ankle in July, diagnosed as an osteochondral problem. With the Canadian border reopening to international travelers on September 7, 2021, Kihira's management announced on September 8 that she would be leaving her Swiss training base with Lambiel to train in Toronto under Brian Orser.

Kihira withdrew from the 2021 CS Asian Open Trophy, her first assigned competition of the season, and was replaced by Mai Mihara. Continuing to rehabilitate her ankle, she withdrew from the 2021 Skate Canada International, her first Grand Prix assignment, and was again replaced by Mihara. She later withdrew from 2021 NHK Trophy as well, with Mana Kawabe being called up to replace her. 

Kihira withdrew from the 2021–22 Japan Championships due to a talus stress fracture in her right foot, first discovered in July 2021. She expressed the intention to concentrate on treatment as per doctors' recommendations. As a result, Kihira could not qualify for a spot for the Japanese Olympic team, as she did not meet the criteria for an injury bye, which required a top three finish at a World Championships, her highest finish to date being fourth at the 2019 World Championships.

2022–23 season 
Continuing to nurse an injury, Kihira accepted an invitation to participate in the Japan Open, saying that she was "not pushing it right now and saving myself in practice but decided to enter anyway." Competing with lessened jump content, she was fifth among six female competitors, scoring 113.44. Kihira was pleased with the result, saying she was "getting my stamina back quite a bit" and that she hoped to be fully recovered" for the Grand Prix.

Following the Japan Open, Kihira was able to return to the Toronto Cricket, Skating and Curling Club to train with coach Brian Orser in person for three weeks in advance of the 2022 Skate Canada International. Orser advised her that this would be "just a start" in light of her continued injury. She placed fifth at that event while not attempting any Lutz or flip jumps. Kihira said afterward that she was "making progress, little by little, and my goal is to get all my triples back." At her second event, the 2022 Grand Prix of Espoo, Kihira finished sixth in the short program. In the free skate, she successfully reintroduced the triple flip, finishing fourth in that segment and fourth overall, 4.98 points behind bronze medalist Mana Kawabe. She said afterward it was a performance "that will give me confidence."

Kihira placed eleventh in the short program at the 2022–23 Japan Championships, after performing only a triple-double jump combination and underrotating two jumps. She was eighth in the free skate, but remained eleventh overall.

Skating technique 
Kihira is regarded as a complete skater for her combination of technical and artistic excellence. Analysts have praised the execution and quality of her jumps, noting their textbook, efficient technique and exceptional distance, rotation speed, rhythm, effortlessness, flow, landing quality, and body position.
Her triple Axel and triple Lutz have received GOE as high as +3.09 and +2.36, respectively. She has notably never received an edge call in her junior or senior career since both her Lutz and Flip have correct take-off edges.

In addition to executing her jumps with high GOE scores, Kihira is also known for landing challenging and difficult jumps. She is the first female skater to land eight fully rotated triples in a program. She has landed triple Axels and triple Axel-triple toe loops in international competition, being the first and now one of two ladies who has achieved the latter. She was the youngest lady to land the triple Axel in an ISU-sanctioned competition until Alysa Liu. She has also landed triple Axels in a three-part combination in domestic competition. She is training the quad toe loop and quad Salchow. She first attempted the quad Salchow in competition at the 2019–20 Grand Prix Final during her free skate, fully rotating but falling on the jump. Her second attempt in competition, at the 2020-21 Japanese National Championships, was landed cleanly with positive grades of execution.

Not only a strong technician known for the quality of her jumps, but she has also been praised for her mature artistry, particularly her overall skating skills and quality of movement, with analysts noting her edge work, multi-directional skating, speed/acceleration, ice coverage, flow, upper body carriage, and extension.

Programs

Records and achievements 

 Set the ladies' technical score of 87.17 points in the free skate, currently held by Alexandra Trusova. 
 Set the ladies' technical score of 48.17 points in the short program, currently held by Alena Kostornaia.
 Set the ladies' record of the new +5 / -5 GOE (Grade of Execution) system for the free program with a score of 147.37 points at the 2018 CS Ondrej Nepela Trophy, previously held by Alexandra Trusova (Russia).
 First lady to land a triple Axel + triple toe loop at the 2017–18 Junior Grand Prix Final.
 The youngest lady to land a triple Axel at the 2016 JGP Slovenia (14 years 54 days).
 Second lady to land two triple Axel jumps in the same program (2018 CS Ondrej Nepela Trophy) behind Mao Asada.
 First lady to land 8 (fully rotated) triple jumps in the free skate (3A, 3Lz+3T, 3Lo, 2A+3T, 3F+2T+2Lo, 3S, 3Lz) at the 2016 JGP Slovenia.
 Second junior lady to land a triple Axel behind Mao Asada.
First lady to win back-to-back the Four Continents Championships.

World record scores 

Kihira has set three world record scores under the new +5 / -5 GOE (Grade of Execution) system.

Competitive highlights 

GP: Grand Prix; CS: Challenger Series; JGP: Junior Grand Prix

Detailed results

Senior level 

Small medals for short and free programs awarded only at ISU Championships. ISU Personal best highlighted in bold. At team events, medals are awarded for team results only.

Junior level 

ISU Personal best (junior) highlighted in bold.

References

External links 
 
 
 
 
 

! colspan="3" style="border-top: 5px solid #78FF78;" |World Record Holders

2002 births
Living people
Japanese female single skaters
Four Continents Figure Skating Championships medalists
People from Nishinomiya